The Great Consoler (translit. Velikiy uteshitel) is a 1933 Soviet drama film directed by Lev Kuleshov and starring Konstantin Khokhlov. The film is based on the facts from the biography of the American writer O. Henry and on his two novels.

Plot

Saleswoman Dulcie dreams of a better, beautiful world. Her dreams are based on the stories of writer Bill Porter, who became victim of a judicial verdict and began his literary career in prison. No special misdemeanors are attributed to him and he even enjoys the right of free movement. The administration appreciates the writer because while serving his sentence he writes beautiful stories with happy endings.

Soon, however the successful writer has to face the obvious injustices going on in the prison. In particular, the writer's friend, Jim Valentine is severely beaten for politically motivated reasons. However, once Valentine is offered freedom in exchange for help in opening a safe. This proposal allows Porter to think about the imminent departure of his friend from prison. Fantasies on this topic become the basis for a new story for the writer.

But the prison administration does not keep the promise and Valentine soon dies. His death is marked by a revolt of prisoners who are dissatisfied with the existing order. Dulcie's pipe dreams are also destroyed and she ends up killing her roommate.

And Bill Porter comes to the conclusion that he is not able to resist the existing order but that someday another one will come.

Cast
 Konstantin Khokhlov - Bill Porter
 Ivan Novoseltsev - Jim Valentine - aka Ralph D. Spenser
 Vasili Kovrigin - Warden
 Andrei Fajt - Det. Ben Price
 Daniil Vvedensky - Jailguard
 Weyland Rodd - Black convict
 O. Rayevskaya - Jim's mother
 S. Sletov - Jailguard
 Aleksandra Khokhlova - Dulcie
 Galina Kravchenko - Annabel Adams
 Pyotr Galadzhev - E. Adams - banker / reporter
 Vera Lopatina - Sadie
 Mikhail Doronin - Innkeeper
 Andrei Gorchilin - Convict

Production
The Great Consoler was done extremely efficiently and did not exceed the budget. The picture was filmed in forty days; editing and soundtrack were completed in sixteen days. The cinematography was done using Soviet manufactured film stock. Kuleshov when making the film, relied heavily on rehearsals, making sure that the actors would totally replicate the results on screen.

References

External links

1933 films
1930s Russian-language films
1933 drama films
Soviet black-and-white films
Films directed by Lev Kuleshov
Adaptations of works by O. Henry
Soviet drama films